The Banning Railroad Bridge is a structure that carries the Wheeling and Lake Erie Railway across the Youghiogheny River in Perry Township, Fayette County, Pennsylvania. 

The bridge was constructed in 1930 by the American Bridge Company as part of the major railroad to be built in Pennsylvania. Like the Speers Railroad Bridge along the same route, the structure uses a "K-truss" design that is extremely uncommon outside of the Great Plains states. Although once part of a critical connection between the Pittsburgh industrial region and the Western Maryland Railroad, today the bridge sees light traffic and is mainly used for the transportation of coal.

External links
Historic Bridges
Wheeling and Lake Erie Railroad history

Bridges in Fayette County, Pennsylvania
Bridges completed in 1930
1930 establishments in Pennsylvania
Bridges over the Youghiogheny River